In enzymology, an acetylornithine transaminase is an enzyme that catalyzes the chemical reaction

N2-acetyl-L-ornithine + 2-oxoglutarate  N-acetyl-L-glutamate 5-semialdehyde + L-glutamate

Thus, the two substrates of this enzyme are N2-acetyl-L-ornithine and 2-oxoglutarate, whereas its two products are N-acetyl-L-glutamate 5-semialdehyde and L-glutamate.

This enzyme belongs to the family of transferases, specifically the transaminases, which transfer nitrogenous groups.  The systematic name of this enzyme class is N2-acetyl-L-ornithine:2-oxoglutarate 5-aminotransferase. Other names in common use include acetylornithine delta-transaminase, ACOAT, acetylornithine 5-aminotransferase, acetylornithine aminotransferase, N-acetylornithine aminotransferase, N-acetylornithine-delta-transaminase, N2-acetylornithine 5-transaminase, N2-acetyl-L-ornithine:2-oxoglutarate aminotransferase, succinylornithine aminotransferase, and 2-N-acetyl-L-ornithine:2-oxoglutarate 5-aminotransferase.  This enzyme participates in urea cycle and metabolism of amino groups.  It employs one cofactor, pyridoxal phosphate.

Structural studies

References

 
 
 

EC 2.6.1
Pyridoxal phosphate enzymes
Enzymes of known structure